Kahrizak Metro Station is the final station of the Tehran Metro Line 1 and is located in Kahrizak, south of Behesht-e Zahra, Tehran. The next stop north is Haram-e Motahhar-e Emam Khomeini. The station was opened on July 21, 2011.

References

Tehran Metro stations